Chen Mao-nan (born 23 May 1941) is a Taiwanese politician who served on the Legislative Yuan from 2002 to 2005.

Education
Chen attended National Taichung Junior College of Commerce and later commenced graduate study at the Institute of Tourism of Chinese Culture University.

Political career
Chen was elected to the National Assembly in 1991 and 1996. Upon stepping down from the National Assembly in 2000, Chen contested the Legislative Yuan elections of 2001. While serving on the Legislative Yuan, Chen maintained an interest in banking and finance. In the midst of the 2003 SARS outbreak, Chen pushed for the World Health Organization to offer Taiwan observer status. He was placed on the Democratic Progressive Party list for the 2008 legislative election, but was not elected via proportional representation.

References

1941 births
Living people
Chinese Culture University alumni
Democratic Progressive Party Members of the Legislative Yuan
Members of the 5th Legislative Yuan
New Taipei Members of the Legislative Yuan
National Taichung University of Science and Technology alumni